Korff Ice Rise  is an ice rise,  long and  wide, lying  east-northeast of Skytrain Ice Rise in the southwestern part of the Ronne Ice Shelf, Antarctica. It was discovered by the US–IGY Ellsworth Traverse Party, 1957–58, and named by the party for Professor Serge A. Korff, vice chairman of the cosmic ray technical panel, U.S. National Committee for the International Geophysical Year, 1957–59.

References

Filchner-Ronne Ice Shelf
Ice rises of Queen Elizabeth Land